Ballyduff Upper GAA Club is a GAA club based in the west County Waterford village of Ballyduff, Republic of Ireland.  The club has won the Waterford Senior Hurling Championship three times, in 1982, 1987 and most recently in 2007.  While mainly a hurling club, the club has had some success in Gaelic football, winning the Waterford Senior Football Championship in 1924.

Ballyduff won the 2007 Waterford Senior Championship after beating Ballygunner on a scoreline of 1-18 to 1-14. Ballyduff are the first West Waterford side to win the county championship since 1993.  The title is seen as a great achievement considering Ballyduff only won the Waterford Intermediate Championship in 2005.Ballyduff Upper Club was awarded the 'Club of the Year award' in 2005

Honours
In addition to being named 'Club of the Year' in 2005, achievements by Ballyduff Upper have included:

Waterford Senior Hurling Championships (3): 1982, 1987, 2007
Waterford Intermediate Hurling Championships (4): 1964, 1975, 2005, 2020
Waterford Junior Hurling Championships (2):  1953, 1971
Waterford Senior Football Championships (1): 1924
Waterford Intermediate Football Championships (2): 1973, 1981, 2013
 Waterford Junior Football Championships (5): 1915, 1917, 1953, 1997, 2008

Notable hurlers

 Mossie Walsh, inter-county hurler and 1980 All-Star
 Stephen Molumphy, inter-county hurler and 2007 All-Star
 Tom Feeney, inter-county hurler
 Patrick Kearney, inter-county hurler
 Adrian Power, football and inter-county hurler
 Paudie Prendergast, inter-county hurler
 Johnny Quirke, inter-county hurler

References

External links
 Official website (archived 2008)

Gaelic games clubs in County Waterford
Hurling clubs in County Waterford
Gaelic football clubs in County Waterford